Gwynn M. Christensen (August 21, 1925 – November 5, 2017) was an American football and baseball coach. He served as the head football coach at Wayne State College in Wayne, Nebraska from 1959 to 1961 and Wisconsin State College–River Falls—now known as the University of Wisconsin–River Falls—from 1962 to 1969. Christensen was also the head baseball coach at Wayne State from 1960 to 1961.

Head coaching record

College football

References

1925 births
2017 deaths
Wayne State Wildcats football coaches
Wisconsin Badgers football players
Wisconsin–River Falls Falcons athletic directors
Wisconsin–River Falls Falcons football coaches
High school football coaches in Wisconsin
People from Lake Mills, Wisconsin
Players of American football from Wisconsin